Ridgewood Park is a neighborhood within the city limits of Tampa, Florida. As of the 2000 census the neighborhood had a population of 379. The ZIP Code serving the area is 33602.

Geography
Ridgewood Park boundaries are by North Boulevard to the east, Columbus Boulevard to the north, and the Hillsborough River to the south and west.

Demographics
Source: Hillsborough County Atlas

At the 2000 census there were 379 people and 181 households residing in the neighborhood. The population density was 2,935/mi2.  The racial makeup of the neighborhood was 53.0% White, 44.0% African American, 0.0% Native American, 0.0% Asian, 0.0% from other races, and 4.0% from two or more races. Hispanic or Latino of any race were about 7.0%.

Of the 181 households 19% had children under the age of 18 living with them, 43% were married couples living together, 10% had a female householder with no husband present, and 8% non-families. 30% of households were made up of individuals.

The age distribution was 13% under the age of 18, 23% from 18 to 34, 26% from 35 to 49, 14% from 50 to 64, and 25% 65 or older. For every 100 females, there were 101 males.

The per capita income for the neighborhood was $24,798. About 6% of the population were below the poverty line.

Education
Ridgewood Park is served by Hillsborough County Public Schools, which serves the city of Tampa and Hillsborough County. Madison Middle is located within the neighborhood.

See also
Neighborhoods in Tampa, Florida

References

External links
Information from the City of Tampa
Ridgewood Park Homeowners Association

Neighborhoods in Tampa, Florida